is a Japanese baseball-themed manga series written and illustrated by Shuichi Shigeno. It was serialized in Kodansha's seinen manga magazine Weekly Young Magazine from June 2015 to April 2017, with its chapters collected in six tankōbon volumes.

Publication
Written and illustrated by Shuichi Shigeno, Sailor Ace was serialized in Kodansha's seinen manga magazine Weekly Young Magazine from June 1, 2015, to April 3, 2017. Kodansha collected its chapters in six tankōbon volumes, released from November 6, 2015, to May 7, 2020.

Volume list

References

Further reading

External links
 

Baseball in anime and manga
Kodansha manga
Seinen manga